The 1970 Pot Black event was the second edition of Pot Black, a professional invitational snooker tournament which was first broadcast in 1969. The event was recorded in early 1970 at the BBC TV Studios in Gosta Green, Birmingham. The tournament featured eight professional players. All matches were one-frame shoot-outs.

Broadcasts were on BBC2, starting with an introductory programme at 9:45 pm on Monday 23 March 1970. This year, the tournament moved to a round-robin format with two groups of four players, the top two players from each group qualifying for a place in the semi-finals. Alan Weeks took over as presenter, with Ted Lowe remaining as commentator and Sydney Lee as referee.

The two finalists were the same as the previous year but the result was in reverse. John Spencer defeated Ray Reardon 88–27 in the one-frame final which was broadcast on 6 July 1970.

Main draw

League 1

League 2

Knockout stage

References

Pot Black
1970 in snooker
1970 in English sport